Squadron Leader Prashant Kumar Bundela (14 December 1970 – 19 August 2002) was a fighter pilot of the Indian Air Force who shot down Pakistan Navy Atlantic over the Rann of Kutch soon after the 1999 Kargil War. He received the prestigious Vayusena medal for this operation on 26 January 2000. He died in 2002 in a MiG-21 crash.

Early life 
Bundela was born on 14 December 1970 in Jhunjhunu, Rajasthan. On 14 December 1991, he was commissioned in the fighter stream and is posted to a Fighter Squadron in the Western Sector.

War Operations 
10 August 1999, two IAF MiG-21 interceptor aircraft of  No. 45 Squadron took off from the Naliya air base at 11 a.m. to investigate an "unidentified" aircraft at India's side of the border. They identified the intruder as a Pakistani Atlantique reconnaissance aircraft. After a series of maneuvers, they got the clearance to shoot down the Pakistani plane. At 11:17 am IST, Bundela fired an infrared homing R-60 air-to-air missile which hit the engine on the port side of the plane causing it to burst into flames and hurtle down into the Kori Creek wasteland.

Death 
On 4 April 2002, Bundela was on a sortie from Adampur to Halwara with Flight Lieutenant S.K. Nayak on a MiG-21 Bison. When they reached somewhere over Jalandhar his aircraft engine began sputtering due to fuel was not being pumped into the R-25 engine and it started flaming. They both ejected, but Bundela landed on his neck while Nayak parachuted safely. He was paralyzed due to spinal injuries, after four months of struggling in the intensive care unit, he died on 19 August 2002.

References 

Indian Air Force officers
Indian Air Force personnel
2002 deaths